The 2002 Toray Pan Pacific Open was a women's tennis tournament played on indoor carpet courts. It was the 19th edition of the Toray Pan Pacific Open, and was part of the Tier I Series of the 2002 WTA Tour. It took place at the Tokyo Metropolitan Gymnasium in Tokyo, Japan, from January 29 through February 3, 2002. First-seeded Martina Hingis won the singles title.

Finals

Singles

 Martina Hingis defeated  Monica Seles, 7–6(8–6), 4–6, 6–3
 It was Hingis' 2nd singles title of the year and the 40th of her career.

Doubles

 Lisa Raymond /  Rennae Stubbs  defeated  Els Callens /   Roberta Vinci, 6–1, 6–1

External links
Official website
Singles, Doubles and Qualifying Singles draws

Toray Pan Pacific Open
Pan Pacific Open
Toray Pan Pacific Open
Toray Pan Pacific Open
Toray Pan Pacific Open
Toray Pan Pacific Open
Toray Pan Pacific Open
2002 Toray Pan Pacific Open